Vollaro is an Italian surname. Notable people with the surname include:

Joseph Vollaro (born 1966), American mobster
Luigi Vollaro (1932–2015), Italian Camorristi of the Vollaro clan

Italian-language surnames